TimescaleDB is an open-source time series database developed by Timescale Inc. It is written in C and extends PostgreSQL. TimescaleDB supports standard SQL queries and is a relational database.  Additional SQL functions and table structures provide support for time series data oriented towards storage, performance, and analysis facilities for data-at-scale. Performance characteristics have been compared to InfluxDB. Time-based data partitioning provides for improved query execution and performance when used for time oriented applications. More granular partition definition is achieved through the use of user defined attributes.

TimescaleDB is offered as open source software under the Apache 2.0 license. Additional features are offered in a community edition as source available software under the Timescale License Agreement (TLS).

History 
Timescale was founded by Ajay Kulkarni (CEO) and Michael J. Freedman (CTO) in response to their need for a database solution to support internet of things workloads.

References 

Free and open-source software
2018 software
Time series software